Bosque Alegre Wildlife Refuge is a protected area in Costa Rica, managed under the Central Conservation Area and created in 1994 under decree 22847-MIRENEM to protect the Lake Hule, Lake Congo and Lake Bosque Alegre, which together make up a lacustrine wetland with a great diversity of flora and fauna. It also protects an aquifer recharge zone for the Río Cuarto canton and surrounding populated centers.

References 

Protected areas established in 1994
Protected areas of Costa Rica